The Soso–Jalonke languages, Susu and Yalunka, form a branch of the Mande languages spoken in an area centered on Guinea

References

Mande languages